The 1848 United States presidential election in Alabama took place on November 7, 1848, as part of the 1848 United States presidential election. Voters chose nine representatives, or electors to the Electoral College, who voted for President and Vice President.

Alabama voted for the Democratic candidate, Lewis Cass, over Whig candidate Zachary Taylor. Cass won Alabama by a narrow margin of 1.12%.

Results

See also
United States presidential elections in Alabama

References

Alabama
1848
1848 Alabama elections